The 2013 Cheltenham Gold Cup (known as the Betfred Gold Cup for sponsorship reasons) was the 85th annual running of the Cheltenham Gold Cup horse race held at Cheltenham Racecourse on 15 March 2013.

Nine horses ran and the steeplechase was won by 11/4 favorite Bobs Worth, who was trained by Nicky Henderson and ridden by Barry Geraghty. Bobs Worth won by a distance of 7 lengths from second-placed Sir Des Champs, with Long Run in third.

The race was shown live on Channel 4 in the UK and Ireland.

Details
 Sponsor: Betfred
 Winner's prize money: £313,225.00
 Going: Soft, Good to Soft in places.
 Number of runners: 9
 Winner's time: 7 mins 5.06 secs

Full result

* The distances between the horses are shown in lengths or shorter. shd = short-head.† Trainers are based in Great Britain unless indicated. PU = pulled-up. NR = non runner

Winners details
Further details of the winner, Bobs Worth.
 Sex: Gelding
 Foaled: 21 May 2005
 Country: Ireland
 Sire: Bob Back; Dam: Fashionista (Kings Theatre)
 Owner: The Not Afraid Partnership
 Breeder: Mrs L Eadie

See also
Horseracing in Great Britain
List of British National Hunt races
2013 Grand National

References

External links
Race Details at Racing Post

Cheltenham Gold Cup
 2013
Cheltenham Gold Cup
2010s in Gloucestershire